Pyrgulopsis castaicensis is a species of very small freshwater snail with an operculum, an aquatic gastropod mollusk in the family Hydrobiidae.

Distribution
Pyrgulopsis castaicensis occurs in only one spring in the upper part of the Santa Clara River basin, in southwestern California.

References

castaicensis
Gastropods described in 2010